Charles le Gai Eaton (also known as Hasan le Gai Eaton or Hassan Abdul Hakeem; 1 January 1921 –  2010) was a British diplomat, writer, historian, and Sufi Islamic scholar.

Life and career

Early life
Born in Lausanne, Switzerland, and raised in London under the name Gai, Eaton was the son of the married Francis Errington and his mistress, Ruth; to hide her son's illegitimacy, Ruth claimed that she had been married to a Canadian, Charles Eaton (an invention of Errington's, by then supposedly deceased), and that Charles had fathered the child. Eaton knew Errington only as a friend of the family until the age of 16, when his mother revealed the truth of his parentage. Brought up agnostic, Eaton was educated at Charterhouse School and King's College, Cambridge, where he studied history and entered into a correspondence with the novelist Leo Myers.

Diplomatic career
Having been passed over for military service during the Second World War, in the late 1940s and early 1950s he worked as a lecturer, teacher and newspaper editor in Egypt (at Cairo University) and Jamaica, before joining the British Diplomatic Service in 1959. As a diplomat, Eaton's postings included the Colonial Office outpost in Jamaica and the Deputy High Commission office in Madras, India, as well as others in Trinidad and Ghana. Eaton returned to the UK permanently in 1974 and retired from his diplomatic career three years later. After retiring from diplomatic service in 1977, he spent the next 22 years as a consultant to the Islamic Cultural Centre in London, where he also edited the Islamic Quarterly Journal.

Academic career
In 1951, with the encouragement of the Sufi academic Martin Lings, Eaton converted to Islam. He was inducted into Lings' Darqawiyya Alwiyya tariqa in 1975. Eaton was a consultant to the Islamic Cultural Centre at Regent's Park Mosque in London for 22 years. In 1996, he served on the committee that drafted the constitution of the Muslim Council of Britain.

Eaton was frequently critical of mainstream British Muslim opinion, and believed that Muslims themselves should have overthrown Saddam Hussein in the 2000s. Regarding the 2003 invasion of Iraq, in an interview with Emel magazine, he stated, "I am very torn either way and I cannot quite make up my mind what I think ... [Saddam] was our monster, it should have been for us to deal with him. But we are so hopeless and helpless we leave it to other people who have their own motives and their own objectives." In the same article, Eaton called for the creation of a British Islamic identity: "It is time for the Muslims in Britain to settle down, to find their own way, to form a real community and to discover a specifically British way of living Islam. The constant arrival of uneducated, non English-speaking immigrants from the subcontinent makes that more difficult."

His works include The Richest Vein (1949), King of the Castle: Choice and Responsibility in the Modern World (1977), Islam and the Destiny of Man (1994; listed on Q News' list of "Ten Books to Take to University"), and Remembering God: Reflections on Islam (2000). He frequently contributed articles to the quarterly journal on comparative religion and traditional studies, Studies in Comparative Religion. Eaton's last book and autobiography, A Bad Beginning and the Path to Islam (2009), was published by Archetype in January 2010. Many British converts to Islam have been inspired by his books, which are also expositions of Islam for Western readers, both religious and secular.

Gai Eaton was an adherent of the Traditionalist School, along with Frithjof Schuon, Martin Lings and others.

Personal life

From his first marriage (1944–50) to the actress Kay Clayton, he was the father of Leo Eaton (b. 1945), an Emmy-winning director and producer of documentary films. In 1956, Eaton married Corah Hamilton, an expatriate Jamaican artist, with whom he had one son and two daughters; Hamilton died in 1984. Eaton was the grandson of the author and journalist J. E. Preston Muddock.

He is buried in the Muslim Section of Brookwood Cemetery.

References

External links
Autobiography at Salaam Books 
"Tribute to the British Muslim Gai Eaton: Glamour and Humility"
"Texts (and Audio) by or related to Shaykh Hassan Gai Eaton"
Gai Eaton website

20th-century British writers
20th-century British diplomats
20th-century scholars
21st-century British writers
Alumni of King's College, Cambridge
British autobiographers
British diplomats in East Asia
British essayists
British expatriate academics
British expatriates in Egypt
British expatriates in Jamaica
British historians
British newspaper editors
British people of Swiss descent
British religious writers
British Sufis
Academic staff of Cairo University
Converts to Islam from atheism or agnosticism
Members of HM Diplomatic Service
20th-century Muslim scholars of Islam
People educated at Charterhouse School
People from Lausanne
Writers from London
Place of death missing
1921 births
2010 deaths
20th-century essayists
21st-century essayists
Burials at Brookwood Cemetery
Traditionalist School